Valerius Gratus was the 4th Roman Prefect of Judaea province under Tiberius from 15 to 26 AD.

History
He succeeded Annius Rufus in 15 and was replaced by Pontius Pilate in 26. The government of Gratus is chiefly remarkable for the frequent changes he made in the appointment of the high-priesthood. He deposed Ananus, and substituted Ishmael ben Fabus, then Eleazar, son of Arianus, then Simon, son of Camith, and lastly Joseph Caiaphas, the son-in-law of Ananus.

In popular culture
In the book Ben-Hur: A Tale of the Christ and its derived films, Gratus is almost killed  by a roof tile which accidentally falls from the home of Judah Ben-Hur, which prompts all subsequent events of the story. In the novel, Gratus is portrayed as a corrupt governor who acted against the Jews by removing the rightful head priest of the Temple, Hannas, and replacing him with a Roman puppet, Ishmael.

See also
 Gens Valeria
 Roman Procurator coinage

References

Bibliography
 Josephus - Antiq. xviii. 6. § 5.
 Smith, Dictionary of Greek and Roman Biography and Mythology

Roman governors of Judaea
1st-century Romans
1st-century Roman governors of Judaea
Valerii